The Boondocks is an American anime-influenced adult animated sitcom created by Aaron McGruder for Cartoon Network's late-night programming block, Adult Swim. It is based upon his comic strip of the same name. The series premiered on November 6, 2005. The show focuses on a dysfunctional black family, the Freemans, settling into the fictional, friendly and predominantly white suburb of Woodcrest. The perspective offered by this mixture of cultures, lifestyles, social classes, stereotypes, viewpoints and racialized identities provides for much of the series' satire, comedy, and conflict.

The series ended its run on June 23, 2014, with a total of 55 episodes over the course of the show's four seasons, the last of which was produced without any involvement from McGruder. The series also has aired in syndication outside the United States and has been released on various DVD sets and other forms of home media.

Widely regarded as one of the greatest animated series of all time, The Boondocks has received several accolades including an NAACP Image Award for Outstanding Writing in a Comedy Series and two Peabody Awards. On June 12, 2019, it was announced that Sony Pictures Animation would be producing a reboot of the television series that was set to premiere in 2022 with McGruder's involvement; John Witherspoon was also attached to the project to reprise his role as Robert Freeman before his passing on October 29, 2019. On September 18, 2019, it was announced that HBO Max had picked up the reboot with a two-season order. The two seasons were set to consist of twelve episodes. On February 2, 2022, it was revealed that development had been cancelled and that the project was shelved.

Development and production 

The Boondocks began as a comic strip on Hitlist.com, one of the first music websites. The strip later found its way into The Source magazine. Following these runs, McGruder began simultaneously pitching The Boondocks as both a syndicated comic strip and an animated television series. The former goal was met first, and The Boondocks debuted in newspapers in April 1999.

In the meantime, the development of the TV series continued. McGruder and film producer/director Reginald Hudlin (President of Entertainment for BET from 2005 to 2008) created a Boondocks pilot for the Fox network, but found great difficulty in making the series acceptable for network television. Hudlin left the project after the Fox deal fell through, though McGruder and Sony Pictures Television were contractually obligated to credit him as an executive producer for the first two seasons. Mike Lazzo, president of Adult Swim and executive producer for Aqua Teen Hunger Force and Space Ghost Coast to Coast, stumbled across the pilot and declared it "too networky". He then ordered a 15-episode season and told McGruder to "just tell stories".

The series has a loose connection with the continuity of the comic strip, though during the final year of the strip McGruder made a point to try to synchronize them. He introduced Uncle Ruckus into the strip, and the comic-strip version of Riley's hair was braided into cornrows to match the character's hair in the series. During Season 1, McGruder put the strip on a 6-month hiatus beginning in March 2006. He did not return to the strip the following November, and the strip's syndicate, Universal Press Syndicate, announced that it had been canceled.

The opening theme song used in the series (slightly remixed for Season 2 and 3) is performed by hip-hop artist Asheru.

The series was produced in widescreen since the beginning, but the image was cropped to accommodate the 4:3 aspect ratio at the time of their original broadcasts as well as reruns. Adult Swim rarely crops widescreen material. Since the third season, the series has been produced in 16:9 high definition and presented in its original aspect ratio and resolution.

In 2014, it was announced that McGruder would not be involved in the show's fourth season. Adult Swim stated, "a mutually agreeable production schedule could not be determined." The fourth season premiered on April 21, 2014, ending its run on June 23, 2014.

Setting 
The series opens with the Freemans settling into the fictional, peaceful, and mostly white suburb of Woodcrest. Evidence for the real-world location of the fictional Woodcrest is mixed. Proponents of the Chicago's South Side theory cite the real-life suburb of Crestwood, Illinois and the similarity of the two names. The first season features several Chicago landmarks: a skyline shot showing the Willis Tower, Grant Park, buildings of the Michigan Avenue Historic District, and Lake Michigan; as well as elevated rapid transit endemic to the city, resembling the Chicago "L". More conclusive evidence is presented in "The Trial of Robert Kelly", in which Riley asks Grandad, "Can you take us into the City tomorrow to watch the R. Kelly Trial?". Grandad denies his request and tells him to walk, and Riley replies "But it's 40 miles!" R. Kelly is from Chicago, and his trial was held there, giving more evidence that The Boondocks is in fact set in Illinois. Another reference to Chicago is Martin Luther King Drive, a major street running through South Chicago, mentioned for its violent activity in the 9th episode of season 1, "Return of the King". Additionally, in "Let's Nab Oprah", Ed Wuncler III, Gin Rummy and Riley go to Oprah Winfrey's television studio in an attempt to kidnap her. The Oprah Winfrey Show was recorded at Harpo Studios in Near West Side Chicago.

Proponents of the Columbia, Maryland theory, cite other evidence, such as McGruder's own childhood there, where his father worked for the National Transportation Safety Board. In the comics, Huey's cellphone number has a 443 area code, which belongs to the Baltimore metropolitan area. In "Wingmen", the Freemans fly 'home' to Chicago, where they lived before moving to Woodcrest, to attend a funeral. In "The Fried Chicken Flu", a reporter on a passing television screen reports on the titular disease's effect on the state of Maryland. In addition, in Season 4's first episode, "Pretty Boy Flizzy", a man references an upcoming concert at Woodcrest Post Pavilion, which may be a play on Columbia's notable concert venue Merriweather Post Pavilion.

Characters 

 Huey Freeman (voiced by Regina King) – 10-year-old Huey Freeman is the family's moral compass and voice of reason. He is an intelligent, wise-beyond-his-years avid reader who is knowledgeable about a variety of subjects. He is heavily influenced by the theories of various left-wing social movements and social justice leaders. His brother and grandfather constantly ridicule and underestimate him, thinking he is a fool to have goals and values that aim higher than the expectations of mainstream American culture. It is mentioned that he has been declared a "domestic terrorist". While he promotes various social causes, he is openly contemptuous of Urban Gangster Rap/Hip Hop as portrayed in mainstream media for glamorizing wasteful extravagance, self-defeating lifestyles, and ignorance. Huey, unlike the other characters, rarely smiles; in the episode "Let's Nab Oprah" he smiles after his duel with Riley; he also smiles when Riley begins to win basketball games in "Ballin'". He is a highly skilled kung-fu fighter, and beats Riley with ease in all of their fights. He has only lost to a few opponents.
 Riley Freeman (voiced by Regina King) – Riley Freeman is Huey's mischievous, rebellious 8-year-old brother, an enthusiastic follower of Urban Gangster Rap/Hip Hop. Though he is otherwise charming, clever, and artistically gifted, Riley maintains loyalty to those Gangster Rap ideals, even in the face of their self-destructive consequences. In "The Fundraiser" Huey tries to warn him directly about the foregone conclusions of his poor decisions, but Riley offhandedly rebuffs him. The bulk of the series focuses on Riley's misadventures (most of which are fueled by his love of gangsta rap and a desire to emulate other people he admires) or on his various outlandish schemes, which his grandfather often endorses and aids. Despite his wild nature and attempts to appear tough, Riley occasionally shows a softer, innocent side. While his brother practices martial arts, Riley is skilled in street fighting, as shown in "Home Alone" and "Smokin' with Cigarettes".
 Robert Jebediah "Granddad" Freeman (voiced by John Witherspoon) – is the grandfather and legal guardian of Huey and Riley. While he loves his two grandsons, he sometimes explodes in tirades of angry frustration over their wisecracking observations, constant schemes, and misadventures, although he has his own moments; for instance, his eagerly misguided dating pursuits unwittingly attract bizarre or dangerous women. According to Season 3's "It's a Black President, Huey Freeman", "Nobody knows exactly how old Robert Freeman is—not even himself." Robert often threatens to discipline his grandsons, mainly Riley with Three Stooges-style corporal punishment and has developed a remarkable degree of speed and dexterity in wielding his belt for this purpose. He was an avid civil rights activist during his salad days.

Episodes 

Both the comic strip and the cartoon were influenced by McGruder's love of anime and manga. He cites Cowboy Bebop and Samurai Champloo as sources of inspiration for the series' fight scenes. The opening sequence of Season 1 contains similarities to that of Samurai Champloo. Some of the humor is based on the characters' anime-style movements. In 2006, McGruder explained in an interview, "We now have a Japanese anime studio named Madhouse to help us out", but at some point, the deal with Madhouse fell through. Instead, the Emmy Award-winning South Korean studio Moi Animation, handled the animation for season two onwards. As a result, the following seasons of the series have more detailed animation, as well as minor updates for most of the character designs.

The episode "Pause" presents a thinly veiled parody of Tyler Perry, presented as using his religion to hide his cross-dressing. The episode reportedly angered Perry, with the network responding to his complaints by saying that they should have warned him before the episode aired.

While the series was originally going to end with the third season, on March 21, 2014, it was revealed via press release from Adult Swim that The Boondocks would return for a fourth and final season. It was later revealed that the fourth season would be produced without the involvement of the series creator Aaron McGruder. The reason cited for the split between the creator and the company was a disagreement over the production schedule. The fourth and final season was co-produced and animated by South Korean studio Studio Mir.

Social critique

Political criticism 
The Boondocks gives commentary on American politics from a black perspective. The series accomplishes this by using satire and controversial statements, such as one of the opening lines in the series, "Jesus was Black, Ronald Reagan was the devil, and the government is lying about 9/11." The show has also given input on subjects like the American government's response to Hurricane Katrina, the Iraq War, and other controversial political events that took place throughout the 2000s. When asked about the show and the approaches taken that make it so controversial, series creator Aaron McGruder said, "I just hope to expand the dialogue and hope the show will challenge people to think about things they wouldn't normally think about, or think about it in a very different way."

Black cultural relevance and critique 
The series typically features appearances by well-known entities (singers, rappers, public figures) within Black popular culture as well as parodies of them. Episodes often feature cameos, as in the episode "Let's Nab Oprah", which features appearances from Oprah Winfrey, Maya Angelou, and Bill Cosby. Other appearances and parodies within the show include R. Kelly on trial for sexual misconduct accusations, DMX's disbelief when told about Barack Obama running for president in an interview, and an episode that mimicked Juice. The series also parodies famous news reports including a broadcast in which a freshman in high school was called a "nigga" by his teacher, who thought the word was acceptable to use. The Boondocks recreates this incident with Riley and his teacher.

The series often challenges the ways African Americans behave and think. It has used sardonic humor to teach lessons and get people thinking since it was a comic strip, critiquing the behavior of famous African Americans throughout the early 2000s. McGruder was interviewed by Nightline in early 2006 on the episode "Return of the King", which sparked much controversy after Martin Luther King Jr. was portrayed reprimanding a crowd of African Americans for being lazy and unaware of their political climate. In the interview, McGruder said, "In the episode, King is critical of our apathy and inactivity... We carry the blame of our own apathy and inactivity... We deserve to take a look at that and be honest about it."

Use of the word "nigga" 
The Boondocks is known for its frequent usage of the word "nigga", which has been a source of controversy for the show throughout its tenure. McGruder once said about the word, "I think it makes the show sincere... the word Nigga is used so commonly now, not only by myself but people I know, that I feel it's fake to write around it and not use it." He also said in a 2005 ABC News article, "This isn't the nigga show... I just wish we would expand the dialogue and evolve past the same conversation that we've had over the past 30 years about race in our country."

Exploration of Black ideology and identity

Writer Terence Latimer asserts that many of the characters in The Boondocks can be seen as caricatures and personifications of recurring identities and ideologies in the Black-American community: Riley Freeman personifies Black pop culture, Huey Freeman represents Black counterculture, Jazmine Dubois is representative of biraciality and loss of innocence in the Black-American community, Uncle Ruckus is a caricature of internalized racism, and Granddad Freeman represents the older, disciplinarian generation struggling to adjust in a new era. In his essay for The Culture Crypt, Niall Smith echoed Latimer’s statements but focused on brothers Huey and Riley Freeman for much of his analysis, arguing that through them is the series able to achieve much of satire and critique of the Black-American community. Smith also notes the importance of secondary characters such as Sarah Dubois, who—through her liking to womanizers and caricatures such as Usher, Pretty Boy Flizzy, and a Stinkmeaner-possessed Tom Dubois—serves to show "how society fetishes and reduces Black men to their most animalistic and negative qualities to appease others".

Reception 
The Boondocks received critical acclaim. In January 2006, it was nominated for Outstanding Comedy Series at the 37th NAACP Image Awards alongside The Bernie Mac Show, Everybody Hates Chris, Girlfriends, and Half & Half. The show won a Special Honorary Academy Award Of Merit in 2006 for the episode "Return of the King", which recognized George Foster Peabody as the Breakout Visionary Achivement In Exellence, For The Most Historic Landmark-In-Crowning-Achivement Milestone In History. The first season garnered a score of 72 out of 100 on Metacritic based on 21 reviews and a 59% rating on Rotten Tomatoes based on 17 reviews. IGN named it the 94th-best animated series, describing it as a sharp satirical look at American society.

Critic Jeffrey M. Anderson of the San Francisco Examiner said, "Each episode is beautifully crafted, with an eye on lush, shadowy visuals and a pulsing, jazz-like rhythm... the show is almost consistently funny, consistently brilliant, and, best of all, compulsively watchable."

Mike Hale of the New York Times has considered The Boondocks among the top television shows of 2010, citing "Pause" as a "painfully funny" satire of Tyler Perry being portrayed as a superstar actor and a leader of a homoerotic cult. In 2013, IGN placed The Boondocks as number 17 on their list of Top 25 animated series for adults.

Criticism and controversy 

The Boondocks has been a frequent subject of controversy since its comic-strip debut in 1999, with ABC News noting, "Fans and critics of The Boondocks loved and hated the strip for the same reasons: its cutting-edge humor and unapologetic, sometimes unpopular, views on various issues, including race, politics, the war on terrorism and the September 11 attacks." Numerous outlets predicted the show would encounter controversy prior to its November 2005 debut, due to its casual use of the word "nigga". In 2006, the Reverend Al Sharpton protested the first-season episode "Return of the King", for Martin Luther King Jr.'s character's use of the word "nigga", saying "Cartoon Network must apologize and also commit to pulling episodes that desecrate black historic figures." Cartoon Network released a statement in response defending McGruder: "We think Aaron McGruder came up with a thought-provoking way of not only showing Dr. King's bravery but also of reminding us of what he stood and fought for, and why even today, it is important for all of us to remember that and to continue to take action," the statement said. The episode was later awarded a Peabody Award for being "an especially daring episode".

During Season 2, two episodes were removed from broadcast without any official word from the network. Originally slated to air on November 16 and December 17, "The Hunger Strike" and "The Uncle Ruckus Reality Show" were both heavily critical of BET. An exclusive clip of "The Hunger Strike" was given to HipHopDX.com in late January 2008, before both episodes were included in full on the Season 2 DVD release in June 2008. An anonymous source close to the show told HipHopDX.com that they heard BET had been pressuring Sony (the studio behind The Boondocks) to ban the episodes and threatened legal action. Cartoon Network publicly stated that "...neither Turner nor Adult Swim were contacted by BET, Ms. Lee or Mr. Hudlin". However, BET's parent company, Viacom, did threaten legal action against Sony if said episodes were broadcast to air in the United States.

Tyler Perry was reportedly infuriated by his depiction in the Season 3 episode "Pause", first aired in June 2010, although he has officially given no response. The episode stars Winston Jerome, a parody of Perry, a "closeted, cross-dressing cult leader whose love of the Christian faith is a mask for his true sexuality," in what the Los Angeles Times described as "one of the sharpest public criticisms of Perry". Soon after the episode aired, Perry got in touch with executives at Turner Broadcasting and "complained loudly" about the episode, threatening to rethink his relationship with the company.

In 2010, Time magazine named The Boondocks as sixth out of 10 of the Most Controversial Cartoons of All Time.

In June 2020, when the initial run of The Boondocks was uploaded to HBO Max, the Season 3 episode "The Story of Jimmy Rebel" was intentionally excluded due to perceived racial insensitivities over the episode's portrayal of a racist country singer named Jimmy Rebel (a parody of real-life white supremacist country singer Johnny Rebel). Upon being asked for comment, an Adult Swim representative stated that "When Adult Swim transitions series to a new platform we determine what episodes are selected through creative and cultural filters and our standards and practices policies. Oftentimes these decisions are made in collaboration with the show’s creator”. Episodes of Aqua Teen Hunger Force and The Shivering Truth were also excluded from the service for similar reasons.

Attempted film spin-off 
McGruder launched a Kickstarter campaign to raise $200,000 in order to produce a live-action film focusing on the character Uncle Ruckus. He stated that crowdfunding would be the sole source of funding for the film's budget. The campaign was from January 30 through March 1, 2013, 7:00 p.m. EST, ending with 2,667 backers and $129,963 of the $200,000 goal. The project ultimately never got off the ground.

Cancelled reboot 

At Annecy 2019, Sony Pictures Animation announced it would be producing a "reimagining" of the television series. On June 12, 2019, a reboot of the series was officially announced with McGruder and voice actor John Witherspoon confirmed to be returning from the original series, before his death on October 29, 2019. On September 18, 2019, it was announced that the reboot would stream on HBO Max in Fall 2020 but this was later postponed to 2021 and then to 2022. The service ordered two seasons, 24 episodes total with a 50-minute special. The complete run of the original 2005 series was also made available on the service. In February 2022, it was announced by actor Cedric Yarbrough that Sony had shelved the reboot.

International broadcast 
Outside the U.S, The Boondocks airs on NITV and The Comedy Channel in Australia. In Canada, Teletoon aired the first two seasons as part of its late-night Teletoon at Night programming block, including several episodes that didn't air in the U.S. It also aired in Quebec on Télétoon's Télétoon la nuit block on March 9, 2007. Sony Entertainment Television (and later Sony Max) as well as Vuzu broadcasts the show in South Africa. It has also been aired on TV3 and TV6 in Sweden, and it aired in New Zealand on Comedy Central. MTV Italy and Comedy Central Italy in Italy (but only seasons 1 and 2,seasons 3 and 4 are unedited in that country, because Sony Entertainment Italy, who owned the rights to the series, is failed), and on channel TV3+ in Denmark.

In Russia, The Boondocks is aired on channel 2×2 under the name of Гетто (Getto, Russian for Ghetto). In Poland, it is broadcast on AXN as Boondocks. In France, it airs on MCM. It airs on Sony Entertainment Television in Latin America, as well as Sony Yay in India. It also airs uncensored and uncut in the Arab World on OSN.

In Japan, it was broadcast on Animax but Seasons 1 and 2 only. That intro theme song is Megalopolis Patrol by the Japanese hip-hop trio, Soul'd Out. It also aired in Latin America on Animax (Latin America).

Home media 
All four seasons have been released on DVD by Sony Pictures Home Entertainment, both individually and as a box set spanning the entire series. Seasons 1 and 2 are presented in the original 16:9 aspect ratio used for production, rather than the 4:3 ratio achieved by cropping the image to fit television screens in use at the time of their original airing. The 16:9 ratio was used for broadcasts of Seasons 3 and 4 and is preserved on the DVD sets.

The Boondocks was also released on iTunes and Amazon Video. Season 1 was also released on UMD.

References

External links 

  at Adult Swim
  at Sony Pictures Television
  at Studio Mir
 
 

The Boondocks
2005 American television series debuts
2014 American television series endings
2000s American adult animated television series
2000s American black cartoons
2000s American black sitcoms
2000s American satirical television series
2000s American sitcoms
2010s American adult animated television series
2010s American black cartoons
2010s American black sitcoms
2010s American satirical television series
2010s American sitcoms
Adult Swim original programming
American animated sitcoms
American adult animated comedy television series
Animated satirical television series
Animated television series about brothers
Animated television series about dysfunctional families
Animated television series about orphans
Animation controversies in television
Anime-influenced Western animated television series
English-language television shows
Race-related controversies in animation
Race-related controversies in television
Peabody Award-winning television programs
Television controversies in the United States
Television shows based on comic strips
Television series by Sony Pictures Television
Television series by Adelaide Productions
Works about race and ethnicity